The Order of Friendship of Peoples was an order of the Soviet Union, and was awarded to persons (including non-citizens), organizations, enterprises, military units, as well as administrative subdivisions of the USSR for accomplishments in strengthening of inter-ethnic and international friendship and cooperation, for economical, political, scientific, military, and cultural development of the Soviet Union. 

It was established on December 17, 1972, on the occasion of the 50th anniversary of the creation of the Soviet Union. The design of order was created by Alexander Zhuk. The status of Order was slightly amended by the Supreme Council of the Soviet Union in July 1980. It was abolished in December 1991. In the Russian Federation it was succeeded by the Order of Friendship, also designed by Alexander Zhuk.

The first recipient was the Russian Soviet Federative Socialist Republic (RSFSR), followed by the other republics of the Soviet Union.

See also
Order of Friendship
Lenin Peace Prize

External links
Order of Friendship of Peoples at the Directory of the orders, medals and signs of the USSR. 

Friendship of Peoples
Military awards and decorations of the Soviet Union
Awards established in 1972
Awards disestablished in 1991
1991 disestablishments in the Soviet Union
1972 establishments in the Soviet Union